Blacks (Canada) or Black (Canada) may refer to:

Blacks

 Black Canadians
 Black Canadians in Montreal
 Black Canadians in Ontario
 Black Nova Scotians
 Blacks Photo Corporation, aka Blacks, a defunct photography store chain

Black

Canadians surnamed Black

 Alexander Black (Canadian politician)
 Conrad Black, Lord Black of Crossharbour - Conrad Black has renounced his Canadian citizenship and is no longer considered Canadian.
 David Holmes Black, publisher
 David Black (Canadian football)
 George Black (Canadian politician)
 John Black (Lower Canada politician)
 John Black (Canadian judge)
 Jully Black, R&B
 Matt Black (Canadian football)
 Terry Black (Canadian football)
 Terry Black, pop singer
 William Black (Canadian politician)

See also
 Blacks (disambiguation)
 Black (disambiguation)